Jacob Azafrani Beliti (24 July 1932 – 16 January 2022), commonly known as Jaco, was a Spanish footballer who played as a defender. He died in Ceuta on 16 January 2022, at the age of 89.

References

External links

1932 births
2022 deaths
People from Larache
Association football defenders
La Liga players
Segunda División players
UD Las Palmas players
Granada CF footballers
Rayo Vallecano players
Limoges FC players
Spanish expatriate footballers
Spanish expatriate sportspeople in France
Expatriate footballers in France
Spanish footballers
Spanish football managers